Matthew John Cowdrey  (born 22 December 1988) is an Australian politician and Paralympic swimmer. He presently holds numerous world records. He has a congenital amputation of his left arm; it stops just below the elbow. Cowdrey competed at the 2004 Paralympic Games, 2006 Commonwealth Games, 2008 Paralympic Games, 2010 Commonwealth Games, and the 2012 Paralympic Games. After the 2012 London Games, he is the most successful Australian Paralympian, having won thirteen Paralympic gold medals and twenty three Paralympic medals in total. On 10 February 2015, Cowdrey announced his retirement from swimming.

Cowdrey contested and won the seat of Colton at the 2018 state election in South Australia for the Liberal Party.

Personal
Cowdrey was born on 22 December 1988 with part of his arm missing due to a congenital amputation. He attended Endeavour College and played basketball when he was younger. He moved to Canberra and started swimming for the Australian Institute of Sport, while continuing to represent the Norwood Swimming Club of Adelaide on the club level. In 2011, he also represented Kawana Waters Swimming Club. , he swims for the Marion Swimming Club.

In April 2015, Cowdrey graduated from the University of Adelaide with a double degree in law and media. In 2013, he undertook a three-month internship with U.S. Congresswoman Ileana Ros-Lehtinen. In 2015, at the time of his retirement, he was working for KPMG in Adelaide.

Swimming
Cowdrey competes in the International Paralympic Committee's S9 (freestyle, backstroke and butterfly,) SB8 (breaststroke), and SM9 (individual medley) classifications, which comprise swimmers with a severe leg weakness, swimmers with slight coordination problems and swimmers with one limb loss. Cowdrey started swimming when he was five years old, and doing so competitively soon after in 1994. He broke his first Australian open record when he was eleven years old, and set his first world record at the age of thirteen.

2004
Cowdrey was one of the youngest Australian competitors at the 2004 Paralympics. At the 2004 Games, he won three gold medals in the men's 4×100-metre medley relay, the 100-metre freestyle S9, and the 200-metre individual medley SM9, for which he received a Medal of the Order of Australia. Cowdrew also won silver medals in the 100-metre butterfly S9 and the 4×100-metre freestyle relay, and bronze medals in the 50-metre freestyle S9 and the 400-metre freestyle S9.

2005
At the 2005 Australian Open, Cowdrey set two world records en route to winning seven gold medals and two bronze medals.

2006
At the 2006 Melbourne Commonwealth Games Trials, Cowdrey set world records and won gold medals in four events: the 200-metre individual medley mixed disability classification, the 100-metre backstroke mixed disability classification, the 50-metre backstroke mixed disability classification, and the 50-metre butterfly mixed disability classification. Additionally, he won gold medals in two other events: the 100-metre freestyle mixed disability classification and the 50-metre freestyle mixed disability classification. At the 2006 Commonwealth Games Trials – Team Qualification Races, he won a gold medal and set a world record in the 100-metre freestyle Elite Athlete with a Disability (EAD) event, and won a gold medal in the 50-metre freestyle (EAD) event.

Cowdrey competed at the 2006 Commonwealth Games in Melbourne, Victoria, where he set two world records and won gold medals in the 50-metre freestyle and 100-metre freestyle events. He was Australia's only male non-relay individual swimming gold medalist in the 2006 Commonwealth Games. At the 2006 World Championships, he set three world records while winning three gold medals, two silver medals and bronze. In 2008, at the Australian Swimming Championships, he won gold medals four events:the 50-metre freestyle, 100-metre freestyle, 100-metre backstroke and 100-metre butterfly. At those same games, he won two silver medals in the 200-metre individual medley and 400-metre freestyle events. These Games had limited opportunities for Paralympic swimmers as not all events were on the event programme.

At the 2006 IPC Swimming World Championships, in Durban, South Africa, Cowdrey won gold medals in five events: the 50-metre freestyle S9, the 100-metre freestyle S9, the 100-metre butterfly S9, the 200-metre individual medley SM9, and the 4×100-metre medley relay (34 points). He also won silver medals in the 100-metre backstroke S9 and the 4×100-metre freestyle relay (34 points), and a bronze medal in the 400-metre freestyle S9.

2008

At the 2008 Summer Paralympics, Cowdrey picked up five gold medals, winning the 50-metre freestyle S9, 100-metre freestyle S9, 100-metre backstroke S9, 200-metre individual medley-SM9, and 4×100-metre medley relay events, all in world-record time. He won three silver medals in the 100-metre butterfly S9, 400-metre freestyle S9, and 4×100-metre freestyle relay events. He also carried Australia's flag during the closing ceremonies for the Games. For his performance at the Games, Cowdrey won Best Male at the Paralympic Sport Awards.

2009
At the 2009 IPC Short Course World Championships in Rio de Janeiro, Brazil, Cowdrey won seven gold medals and two silver medals. In 2009, he competed in his first international competition against able-bodied swimmers in Tucson, Arizona.

2010
At the 2010 IPC Swimming World Championships, Cowdrey, who was classified as an S9 swimmer, won six gold medals and one silver medal. One of the medals was in the men's 4×100-metre relay race. At the 2010 Delhi Commonwealth Games, he won a gold medal in the 50-metre freestyle S9 event in a world record time of  25.33 seconds, which is still standing as of February 2012.

2011
In April 2011, he participated in the Telstra Australian Swimming Championships. In July 2011, he participated at the Australian Short Course Championships. In August 2011, he participated in the Pan Pacific Para Swimming Championships. In October 2011, he participated at the 2011 Swimmeroo QLD Long Course. In December, he competed in the Can-Am Swimming Open. A week before the Can-Am Swimming Open, Cowdrey was reclassified for breaststroke from SB9 to SB8. He won a gold medal in the SB8 100-metre breaststroke, with the fourth fastest time posted for the event during 2011 at 1:12.85.

2012

At the 2012 Summer Paralympics, Cowdrey won gold medals in the 100-metre backstroke S9, 50-metre freestyle S9, 100-metre freestyle S9, 200-metre individual medley SM9, and 4×100-metre freestyle relay (34 points). He also won silver medals in the 100-metre butterfly S9 and 100-metre breaststroke SB8, and a bronze medal in the 4×100-metre medley relay (34 points). Cowdrey became Australia's most successful Paralympian with his victory in the men's 50-metre freestyle S9 event at the 2012 London Games, winning his 11th gold medal and 20th medal overall and surpassing Tim Sullivan in gold medal count and Kingsley Bugarin in overall medal count.

2013
In June 2013, Cowdrey confirmed that he would aim to compete at the 2016 Rio Games. He was back living in Glenelg and training at the South Australian Aquatic Centre. Competing at the 2013 IPC Swimming World Championships in Montreal, Cowdrey won five gold medals in the 50-metre freestyle S9, 100-metre freestyle S9, 100-metre backstroke S9, 200-metre individual medley SM9, and 4×100-metre freestyle relay (34 points), and a bronze medal in the 100-metre butterfly S9.

2014
At the 2014 Glasgow Commonwealth Games, Cowdrey won a silver medal in the 100-metre freestyle S9.

Retirement
On announcing his retirement from swimming on 10 February 2015, Cowdrey stated: "I have been fortunate to have achieved more than I could ever have dreamed of, and more than I set out to achieve, and more importantly I have enjoyed every minute of my time on the Australian swim team." Glenn Tasker, president of the Australian Paralympic Committee, said, "It has been an absolute privilege to watch Matthew develop from the quiet 15-year-old kid who competed at his first Paralympics in 2004, into one of the greats of Australian Paralympic sport. He has become an outstanding ambassador for the Paralympic movement, a leader of the Paralympic swim team and our most successful athlete ever."

Post-swimming career
Cowdrey was appointed as the team general manager of the Australian team for the 2015 Commonwealth Youth Games to be held in Samoa. In 2017, Cowdrey was preselected to run for the Liberal Party in the Labor-held seat of Colton at the 2018 state election in South Australia. He was re-elected as the member for Colton at the 2022 state election despite the election resulting in the Liberal Party losing Government and returning to Opposition. In April 2022 new Liberal leader David Speirs promoted him to the Opposition frontbench as Shadow Treasurer.

Recognition 

In 2004, at the Australian Paralympian of the Year Awards, he was named the Young Paralympian of the Year. In 2006, Cowdrey won the Commonwealth Sports Award in the category of male Elite Athlete with a Disability (EAD). Swimming Australia named him their Swimmer of the Year with a Disability for four years in a row, from 2004 to 2007. He was also named to Swimming Australia's  All-Star Swim Team in 2006 and 2007. Swimming World Magazine has named him their "World Swimmer of the Year with a Disability."  In 2009, he was named the Young South Australian of the Year. In 2011, he was inducted into the Australian Institute of Sport's "Best of the Best".  Cowdrey was a finalist for the 2012 Australian Paralympian of the Year. In 2012, The South Australia Aquatic & Leisure Centre decided to name its main competition pool after Cowdrey. The City of Salisbury gave him the keys to the city in 2013.  In October 2014, he was inducted into the Path of Champions at the Sydney Olympic Park Aquatic Centre. In 2016, he was awarded Speedo Services to the Australian Swim Team at the Swimming Australia Awards. He is an inductee of the Swimming South Australia Hall of Fame. in 2019, he was inducted into Sport Australia Hall of Fame. In 2022, he was inducted into the Paralympics Australia Hall of Fame.

References

External links 
 
 
 
 

Commonwealth Games gold medallists for Australia
Commonwealth Games silver medallists for Australia
Male Paralympic swimmers of Australia
Swimmers at the 2004 Summer Paralympics
Swimmers at the 2006 Commonwealth Games
Swimmers at the 2008 Summer Paralympics
Swimmers at the 2010 Commonwealth Games
Swimmers at the 2012 Summer Paralympics
Swimmers at the 2014 Commonwealth Games
Medalists at the 2004 Summer Paralympics
Medalists at the 2008 Summer Paralympics
Medalists at the 2012 Summer Paralympics
Paralympic gold medalists for Australia
Paralympic silver medalists for Australia
Paralympic bronze medalists for Australia
Australian male freestyle swimmers
Australian male backstroke swimmers
Australian male breaststroke swimmers
Australian male butterfly swimmers
Australian male medley swimmers
Recipients of the Medal of the Order of Australia
World record holders in paralympic swimming
Australian amputees
Australian Institute of Sport Paralympic swimmers
University of Adelaide alumni
1988 births
Living people
S9-classified Paralympic swimmers
Sportspeople from Adelaide
Commonwealth Games medallists in swimming
Australian sportsperson-politicians
Liberal Party of Australia members of the Parliament of South Australia
Members of the South Australian House of Assembly
Paralympic Sport Awards — Best Male winners
Sport Australia Hall of Fame inductees
Medalists at the World Para Swimming Championships
Paralympic medalists in swimming
21st-century Australian politicians
Medallists at the 2006 Commonwealth Games
Medallists at the 2010 Commonwealth Games
Medallists at the 2014 Commonwealth Games